Anne Twomey may refer to:
Anne Twomey (academic), Australian legal scholar and lawyer
Anne Twomey (actress) (born 1951), American actress